This page lists the motorcycles produced by the British motorcycle manufacturer Greeves Motorcycles Ltd.

See also
List of Ariel motorcycles
List of BSA motorcycles
List of Triumph motorcycles
List of Norton motorcycles

Greeves
Greeves